Lukyanivka is a historical neighborhood in the northwestern part of the city of Kyiv, the capital of Ukraine. It is situated on the right bank of Dnieper, at a short distance from Babi Yar (part of Kurenivka).

The Kyiv Metro station located in the neighborhood is Lukianivska, on the Syretsko-Pecherska Line.

The area is also known for the Lukyanivska Prison.

The neighborhood was named after a Podil guildmaster and "began to grow after the great flood of 1845 forced many inhabitants to higher ground"; its population in 1874 was 9,806. In the spring of 1911, the body of Andrei Yushchinsky was found in a cave in Lukyanivka, leading to the Mendel Beilis case.

The Kyiv TV Tower was built on top of the Jewish cemetery in Lukianovka. The cemetery was officially closed in 1966 and Jewish families were given six months to rebury their relatives in the Jewish areas of a new cemetery in the city. Since the relatives of the interred had been killed in the Babi Yar massacre, most of the graves were not moved. After the headstones had been destroyed or removed the antenna was built on top of the existing graves.

Historical overview 
 1820 — first mention of Lukyanivka settlement;
 1824 — a mention of Kyiv goldsmith S. Strelbytsky in the outskirts of Lukyanivka;
 1913 — first all-Russian olympiad in sports is held at the Sports Ground.

Notes 

Neighborhoods in Kyiv
Shevchenkivskyi District, Kyiv